"I Should Have Known Better" is a song by English rock band the Beatles composed by John Lennon (credited to Lennon–McCartney), and originally issued on A Hard Day's Night, their soundtrack for the film of the same name released on 10 July 1964. "I Should Have Known Better" was also issued as the B-side of the US single "A Hard Day's Night" released on 13 July. An orchestrated version of the song conducted by George Martin appears on the North American version of the album, A Hard Day's Night Original Motion Picture Soundtrack.

Origin
"I Should Have Known Better" was one of several songs written and recorded specifically for the Beatles' debut movie, "A Hard Day's Night". The harmonica-driven arrangement by the group was similar to Frank Ifield's recording of "The Wayward Wind", a hit on the UK Singles Chart in March 1963. The Beatles were fans of Ifield and his music, and recorded his rendition of "I Remember You" in their Hamburg stage act in 1962.

Recording
The first recording session for the song was on 25 February 1964 at EMI Studios when three takes were attempted, but only one was complete. Take two was aborted when Lennon broke into hysterics over his harmonica playing. The song was re-recorded the next day after making some changes to the arrangement.

Lennon's harmonica playing opens the track, the last occasion the Beatles were to feature this instrument on an intro ("I'm a Loser", recorded 14 August 1964 has a harmonica solo). The song's middle sixteen section features George Harrison's new Rickenbacker 360/12 12-string guitar.

The mono and stereo versions have slightly different harmonica introductions. In the stereo version, the harmonica drops out briefly. Also, a noticeably clumsy and audible tape edit is heard during the second chorus between "You're gonna say you love me too, oh," and "And when I ask you to be mine."

Releases

United Kingdom
In the UK, "I Should Have Known Better" was included on A Hard Day's Night, which was released on 10 July 1964. A single was not issued at that time, but in 1976, the song was released as a B-side to "Yesterday".

United States
In the US, "I Should Have Known Better" was released on 13 July 1964 as the B-side to "A Hard Day's Night" and reached number 53 in the Billboard Hot 100, and number 43 on the Cash Box chart.

As part of the film contract, United Artists acquired album rights for the American market. The company released a soundtrack album on 26 June 1964 with eight Beatles songs and four instrumentals. "I Should Have Known Better" was performed in the film, and it appears on the soundtrack. Capitol Records released Something New a month later with songs from the UK version of A Hard Day's Night that were not used in the film. The songs were also later released by Capitol on the Hey Jude compilation album in 1970.

Continental Europe
"I Should Have Known Better" was released as a single in a number of continental European countries, including Norway, where it reached number one, Italy where it spent a week at number 15, West Germany, where it reached number six, and Sweden, where it topped the Kvällstoppen Chart for four weeks.

Personnel
John Lennon – double-tracked vocal, acoustic rhythm guitar, harmonica
Paul McCartney – bass guitar
George Harrison – twelve-string lead guitar
Ringo Starr – drums
Personnel per Ian MacDonald

On film
The song is performed in the train compartment scene of A Hard Day's Night. It was in fact filmed in a van, with crew members rocking the vehicle to simulate the action of a train in motion. Paul McCartney is seen lip-syncing in the song, both in the train scene and in the live performance at the end of the film, despite not singing in the actual recording.

Notes

References

External links

 

1964 songs
1964 singles
1976 singles
The Beatles songs
The Beach Boys songs
Song recordings produced by George Martin
Number-one singles in Norway
Number-one singles in Sweden
Songs written by Lennon–McCartney
Phil Ochs songs
She & Him songs
Jan and Dean songs
Capitol Records singles
Songs written for films
Songs published by Northern Songs